Huelva is a province of southern Spain, in the western part of the autonomous community of Andalusia. It is bordered by Portugal, the provinces of Badajoz, Seville, and Cádiz, and  the Atlantic Ocean. Its capital is Huelva.

Its area is 10,148 km². Its population is 483,792 (2005), of whom about 30% live in the capital, and its population density is 47.67/km². It contains 79 municipalities.

The economy is based on agriculture and mining. The famous Rio Tinto mines have been worked since before 1000 BC, and were the major source of copper for the Roman Empire. As an indication of the scope of ancient mining, sixteen million tons of Roman slag have been identified at the Roman mines. British companies resumed large-scale mining  in 1873; the district is the namesake of the Rio Tinto Group.

The province contains Palos de la Frontera, and Moguer, where Christopher Columbus sailed out of on his first voyage in 1492, and shares the Parque Nacional de Doñana, located mainly in Almonte.

Government and administration

Population
The historical population is given in the following chart:

Tourism 

The delayed tourist development of the province has allowed better city planning than in other regions on the Spanish coast. The nuclei of Islantilla and Isla Canela are an example of this attempt to plan in a more coherent form. Although in a smaller scale in comparison to other regions, urban pressure continues. Previous developments that had little planning until recent time are El Rompido, El Portil, Mazagón and Matalascañas (Torre de la Higuera).

Although Punta Umbría had its beginnings like pedanía de Cartaya, after the democratization of summer tourism, it began its urban development for its proximity to the capital and its location on the beach. Present development would not endure without tourist activity and its vacation housing. Other tourist areas are Nuevo Umbría, Nuevo Portil, Punta del Moral, La Antilla and Urbasur.  The marismas de Isla Cristina, next to the towns of Ayamonte and Isla Cristina, are a protected nature reserve.

Of note is Huelva's recent classification of “rural tourism” for its interior mountain range.

Green electricity
Huelva has 388 megawatts (MW) of wind power, 68 MW biomass power, and 66 MW of solar power. A 220 kilovolt transmission line has been constructed to send power to the main grid as well as improving connections between Spain and Portugal.

See also 
 List of municipalities in Huelva
 Labour inspectorate
 Port of Isla Cristina

References

External links
 
 
Natural Park Doñana    
Natural Park Sierra de Aracena and Picos de Aroche 
Mine & mineral localities in Huelva at Mindat.org